Christopher Russell Campling (4 July 1925 – 9 December 2020) was a British Anglican priest who was the Dean of Ripon.

Early life and education
Campling was born on 4 July 1925 and educated at Lancing College and St Edmund Hall, Oxford.

Ordained ministry
Ordained in 1952 he began his career with a curacy in Basingstoke after which he was a Minor Canon  at Ely Cathedral. He was then appointed Chaplain of his old school. Later Vicar then Rural Dean of Pershore, his next appointment was as Archdeacon of Dudley in 1975 — a post he held jointly with his role as director of education for the Anglican Diocese of Worcester and priest-in-charge of St Augustine's Church, Dodderhill, Droitwich. Then, in 1984, he was appointed Dean of Ripon. After 11 years as head of Ripon Cathedral, he retired from full-time ministry.

Campling belonged to the liberal wing of the Church of England. He was a supporter of ecumenism, the ordination of women, the re-marriage of divorcees in church.

An eminent author, he retired to Worthing where he wrote his memoir, I Was Glad. He continued to preach and lecture occasionally in retirement.

He died on 9 December 2020 at the age of 95.

References

1925 births
2020 deaths
People educated at Lancing College
Alumni of St Edmund Hall, Oxford
Archdeacons of Dudley
Deans of Ripon